Ambel (Amber), also known as Waigeo after the island where it is primarily spoken, is a heavily Papuan-influenced Austronesian language spoken on the island of Waigeo in the Raja Ampat archipelago near the northwestern tip of West Papua, Indonesia. It is spoken by approximately 1,600 people. It is endangered, as the population is shifting to Papuan Malay and few people born after the year 2000 have any knowledge of the language.

Dialects
Ambel is spoken by approximately 1,600 people on Waigeo, an island in the Raja Ampat archipelago near the northwestern tip of West Papua, Indonesia. There are two dialects of Ambel:

Metsam Ambel, spoken in the two villages of Warsamdin and Kalitoko on Waigeo Island
Metnyo Ambel, spoken in the nine villages of Warimak, Waifoi, Kabilo, Go, Kapadiri, Kabare, Bonsayor, Darumbab, and Andey on Waigeo Island

Ambel speakers live alongside Biak speakers in the three villages of Warsamdin, Kabare, and Andey.

Distribution
Ambel is spoken in the following locations within Raja Ampat Regency:

Waigeo Utara District: Kabare and Kapadiri villages.
Teluk Manyalibit District: Kabilol, Go, Waifoy, Warimak, Kalitoko and Warsamdin villages.

Phonology 
The sounds of the Ambel language are as follows:

// can be heard as [] or [] in free variation.

Proto-language

Arnold (2018) reconstructs two tonemes for proto-Ambel, high /3/ and rising /12/, which is similar to the tonal system of Ma'ya.

Below are some monosyllabic proto-Ambel reconstructed lexical forms that have cognates with Matbat and Ma'ya. The Misool dialect is given for some Ma'ya forms; they are otherwise from the Salawati dialect.

{| class="wikitable sortable"
! gloss !! Proto-Ambel !! Matbat !! Ma'ya
|-
| 'betel leaf' ||  ||  || 
|-
| 'breast' || – ||  || 
|-
| 'canoe' ||  ||  || 
|-
| 'come' || – ||  || 
|-
| 'die' ||  ||  || 
|-
| 'eight' ||  ||  || 
|-
| 'enter' ||  ||  || 
|-
| 'fire' ||  ||  || 
|-
| 'fish' ||  || – || 
|-
| 'five' ||  ||  || 
|-
| 'four' ||  ||  || 
|-
| 'full' ||  ||  || 
|-
| 'give' ||  ||  || ˈbe (Misool)
|-
| 'good' ||  ||  || 
|-
| 'green/blue' ||  ||  || –
|-
| 'ground, earth' ||  ||  || 
|-
| 'hear' || – ||  || 
|-
| 'kill' ||  ||  || 
|-
| 'know' ||  ||  || -ˈun (Misool)
|-
| 'louse' ||  ||  || 
|-
| 'man' ||  ||  || ˈma¹²n (Misool)
|-
| 'mother' ||  ||  || 
|-
| 'mountain' ||  ||  || 
|-
| 'mouth' || – ||  || 
|-
| 'much' || – ||  || 
|-
| 'needle' ||  ||  || –
|-
| 'night' ||  ||  || –
|-
| 'person' ||  ||  || 
|-
| 'rice' ||  ||  || 
|-
| 'rise, ascend' ||  ||  || 
|-
| 'sago' ||  || – || 
|-
| 'sand' ||  ||  || 
|-
| 'sea turtle' ||  ||  || 
|-
| 'seawards' || – ||  || 
|-
| 'see' ||  ||  || 
|-
| 'shoot' || – ||  || 
|-
| 'snake' ||  ||  || 
|-
| 'swim' ||  ||  || -ˈa¹²s (Misool)
|-
| 'three' ||  ||  || 
|-
| 'tree, wood' ||  ||  || 
|-
| 'two' ||  ||  || 
|-
| 'village' ||  'house' ||  || 
|-
| 'walk' ||  || – || ˈdak (Misool)
|-
| 'white' ||  ||  || 
|-
| 'woman' ||  || 'kind of mangrove' || 
|}

Further reading

References

Bibliography

External links 
 Deposit of Ambel-language materials at the Endangered Languages Archive

South Halmahera–West New Guinea languages
Languages of western New Guinea
Tonal languages in non-tonal families